Sant Carles de Peralta is a village in the north east of Ibiza, Spain. The village is in the municipality of Santa Eulària des Riu and is located on the designated road PM 810.

Locations
To the south of the village are chimneys and ruined buildings, the remains of lead mines first exploited by the Carthaginians. 
The Church of Sant Carles is noted to have an arcaded entrance. Next to it is the famous and historic Bar Anita, the original gathering place for hippies in the 1960s.

References

Populated places in Ibiza